The Imperial Order of the Double Dragon  was an order awarded in the late Qing dynasty.

The Order was founded by the Guangxu Emperor on 7 February 1882 as an award for outstanding services to the throne and the Qing court. Originally it was awarded only to foreigners but was extended to Chinese subjects from 1908. It was the first Western-style Chinese order, established in the wake of the Second Opium War as part of efforts to engage with the West and adopt Western-style diplomatic practices. Traditionally the Chinese court did not have an honours system in the Western sense; however hat buttons, rank badges, feathers and plumes were routinely awarded by the Emperor to subjects and foreigners alike prior to and after the introduction of the Order of the Double Dragon. The order was replaced in 1911 during the last days of the Qing dynasty by the Order of the Imperial Throne, although this replacement was never fully implemented and the Republic of China discontinued the imperial orders after its establishment in 1912.

Design
 
The order took on many different designs and forms until its abolition in 1911. Gradations were distinguished most commonly by differentiation in the type and size of precious stones inlaid, the shape of the medallion, the length of the ribbon, and the material used to construct the medallion. Gold and pearl were reserved for the higher classes, enamel and coral for the lowest classes. The original designs were similar in style and appearance to traditional Chinese insignia, but they proved cumbersome for many to wear and in 1897 they were redesigned in the form of a Western-style breast-badge, although the original designs were still awarded for some time afterwards. Similar symbolic motifs accompanied all designs over the award's history, most notably two dragons surrounding a central precious stone and flames which were connotative symbols of imperial authority. Other symbols of imperial authority - mountains, clouds, plum blossoms and characters with providential meanings - were added to variations of the designs over time.

Classes

The order consisted of five classes, the first three of which were divided into three grades. The rules for award and the nature of the gradations was set out in the statues establishing the award in 1882. The rules were modified somewhat in 1897.

First Class, First Grade: for emperors and kings of foreign nations
First Class, Second Grade: for princes, and royal family members and relatives (later limited to royal family members who had earned, and not inherited, senior positions in government)
First Class, Third Grade: for ministers of who had inherited their position, general ministers, and diplomatic envoys of the first rank.
Second Class, First Grade: for diplomatic envoys of the second rank
Second Class, Second Grade: for diplomatic envoys of the third rank and customs commissioners
Second Class, Third Grade: for counselors of the first rank, consul-generals and military generals
Third Class, First Grade: for counselors of the second and third rank, the entourage of consul-generals, and second-tier military officers
Third Class, Second Grade: for deputy consuls, and third-tier military officers
Third Class, Third Grade: for translators and military officers of the fourth and fifth tiers
Fourth Class: for soldiers and non-commissioned officers
Fifth Class: for businessmen and traders

Recipients
Despite the comprehensive ranking system, the actual awarding of the classes was lopsided, and very few Fourth or Fifth class were ever given. The much higher ranking of translators and other civil servants in the system compared to even the wealthiest Western industrialists and businessmen was in part reflecting of the traditional Chinese antipathy towards profit-seeking and commercial individuals, compared the honourability accorded to civil service. Despite patriarchal traditions however, foreign women were bestowed the order, including Canadian missionary Leonora King and American artist Katherine Carl. Native Chinese were granted the right to order in 1908, but very few Chinese ever received the award and it remained an overwhelmingly internationally awarded order.

Awards to the imperial family
 Guangxu Emperor, Sovereign
 Xuantong Emperor, Sovereign
 Zaitao

Chinese recipients
 Li Hongzhang
 Yinchang
 Liang Dunyan
 Lou Tseng-Tsiang
 Hu Weide
 Wu Lien-teh

Foreign recipients

Class I
 Nicholas II, Emperor of All Russia, Class I Grade I in Diamonds, 4 May 1896
 Frederick III, German Emperor, Class I Grade I
 Leopold II, King of the Belgians, Class I Grade I
 Albert I, King of the Belgians, Class I Grade I
 Meiji, Emperor of Japan, Class I Grade I, 20 December 1898
 Gojong, Emperor of Korea, Class I Grade I, 1 December 1903
 Abu Bakar, Sultan of Johor, Class I Grade I, 1892
 Pakubuwono X, Susuhunan of Surakarta, Class I Grade I
 Sadanaru, Prince Fushimi, Class I Grade I, 27 April 1909 (Class I Grade II: 27 November 1904)
 Henry, Prince of Prussia, Class I Grade II
 Georg, Prince of Bavaria, Class I Grade II, 1903
 Eitel Friedrich, Prince of Prussia, Class I Grade II
 Rupprecht, Crown Prince of Bavaria, Class I Grade II
 Wilhelm, German Crown Prince, Class I Grade II
 Morimasa, Prince Nashimoto, Class I Grade II, 20 May 1903
 Hiroyasu, Prince Fushimi, Class I Grade II, 9 May 1903
 Kotohito, Prince Kan'in, Class I Grade II, 27 January 1904
 Baron Edmond de Gaiffier d'Hestroy, Belgium, Class I
 Prince Katsura Tarō, Prime Minister of Japan, Class I Grade II, 21 December 1907 (Class I Grade III: 18 December 1899)
 Georg von der Marwitz, Germany, Class I Grade II
 Erich von Gündell, Germany, Class I Grade II
 Duke Itō Hirobumi, Prime Minister of Japan, Class I Grade III, 5 December 1898
 Herbert von Bismarck, Prince of Bismarck, Class I Grade III
 Vladimir Sukhomlinov, Minister of War of Russia, Class I Grade III, 1911
 Porfirio Díaz, President of Mexico, Class I
1910
 Martin Friedrich Kautzsch, Medical Doctor of the Court, Class I Grade III, 1911

Class II
 Dejan Subotić, Russia, Class II Grade I, 1896
 Konstantin Glinka, Russia, Class II Grade III, 1898
 Sir Halliday Macartney, United Kingdom, Class II Grade I, 1902
Robert Bredon, United Kingdom, Deputy Inspector-general of Customs at Shanghai, Class II Grade III, 1902
 Rudolf Stöger-Steiner von Steinstätten, Austria, Class II Grade II, 1911
 Okura Kihachiro, Japan, Class II Grade II, 10 February 1912
 Paul von Buri, Germany, Class II Grade III
 John Edward Foley, United Kingdom, Traffic Manager of the Imperial Chinese Railways, Class II Grade III, 1902
 Rihachirō Banzai, Japan, Class II, 2 July 1908
 Adolf von Deines, Germany, Class II Grade I

Class III
 Rudolf, Prince of Liechtenstein, Class III Grade I
 Claude William Kinder CMG, United Kingdom, Chief Engineer Imperial Railways of North China, Class III Grade I, 1891 
 Erich Raeder, Germany, Class III Grade II, 10 October 1898
 John Penniell, United Kingdom, Chief Instructor at the Nanking Naval College, Class III Grade II, 1902
 Józef Dowbor-Muśnicki, Russia, Class III
 Frank Arthur Morgan (1844-1907), United Kingdom, Commissioner of Imperial Chinese Maritime Customs, Class III, Grade 1

Unknown
 Alexei Nikolaevich, Tsarevich of Russia
 Camillio Romano Avezzana, Italy
 Major General Charles George Gordon, United Kingdom
 Cardinal Désiré-Joseph Mercier, Belgium
 Dr Leonora King, Canada
 Heinrich Johannes Bleeker, Germany
 Richard Theodore Greener, United States, 1902
 Baron Julien Liebaert, Belgium, Knight Grand Cross
Victor Vifquain, United States
 Viscount João Vieira Lins Cansanção, Prime Minister of Brazil
 Thomas Adamson Consul General, United States
 Pernot Claudius Ferdinand, France
 Katharine Carl, United States
 Dr Dugald Christie, Scottish medical missionary, associated with the United Presbyterian Church of Scotland, 1897.

See also 
 Order of the Precious Brilliant Golden Grain: ROC award
 Order of Brilliant Jade: ROC award for foreign recipients

Notes and references

External links
 Classification of the Qing Dynasty Double Dragon Orders, Chinese Medal Blog

Orders, decorations, and medals of Imperial China
Dynastic orders
Awards established in 1882
1882 establishments in China
Foreign relations of Imperial China
Orders of chivalry awarded to heads of state, consorts and sovereign family members